Altrichthys is a small genus of damselfish in the family Pomacentridae, native to the central Indo-Pacific.

Species
There are three species in the genus.

Altrichthys alelia Bernardi, Longo & Quiros, 2017
Altrichthys azurelineatus (Fowler and Bean, 1928) - azure damsel
Altrichthys curatus (Allen, 1999) - guardian damselfish

References

External links
Froese, R. and D. Pauly, Eds. Altrichthys. FishBase. 2013.

Chrominae
Marine fish genera